This is a list of lighthouses in Estonia.

Lighthouses

See also 
 Lists of lighthouses

References

External links 

 

Estonia

Lighthouses
Lighthouses